Leo Atzwanger (born 25 April 1944) is an Italian luger. He competed in the men's singles event at the 1972 Winter Olympics.

References

External links
 

1944 births
Living people
Italian male lugers
Olympic lugers of Italy
Lugers at the 1972 Winter Olympics
People from Kiens
Sportspeople from Südtirol